Emmanuel Obbo, A. J. (born 7 October 1952), is a Ugandan Roman Catholic priest who serves as Archbishop of the Roman Catholic Archdiocese of Tororo, since 2 January 2014. He previously served as the Bishop of Roman Catholic Diocese of Soroti, from 27 Jun 2007 until 2 January 2014.

Background and priesthood
Obbo was born on 7 October 1952 in Nagoke Village, Kirewa Sub-county, in present-day Tororo District, in the Eastern Region of Uganda. He was ordained a priest on 13 December 1986. He served as priest in the Archdiocese of Tororo until 27 June 2007.

As bishop
He was appointed Bishop of Roman Catholic Diocese of Soroti on 27 June 2007and was consecrated a bishop at Soroti on 6 October 2007 by Bishop Erasmus Desiderius Wandera, Bishop Emeritus of Soroti, assisted by Archbishop Denis Kiwanuka Lote, Archbishop of Tororo and Archbishop James Odongo, Auxiliary Bishop of Tororo.

On 2 January 2014, Obbo was appointed Archbishop of Tororo and concurrently appointed Apostolic Administrator of Soroti. He was installed as Archbishop on 1 March 2014. As of July 2019, he is the Archbishop of Tororo and concurrent Apostolic Administrator of Soroti.

Succession table at Tororo

References

External links

 Profile of the Roman Catholic Diocese of Tororo

1952 births
Living people
21st-century Roman Catholic archbishops in Africa
21st-century Roman Catholic bishops in Uganda
Roman Catholic archbishops of Tororo

Roman Catholic bishops of Soroti